The Ice Forest is a 2014 thriller film written and directed by Claudio Noce and starring Emir Kusturica, Kseniya Rappoport and Adriano Giannini. It premiered at the 2014 Rome Film Festival.

Plot 
Pietro, a young specialized technician, arrives in a small Alpine town on the Slovenian border to repair a fault in the high-altitude power plant and then suddenly finds himself faced with a strange disappearance. A strong clash is therefore created between the young Pietro and two brothers, Lorenzo and Secondo, who work and live in that area. Once Pietro discovers the origin of the secrets hidden in the valley, all tension erupts, starting a game of distorting mirrors in which no one, not even Lana, the bear expert, is immune from suspicion.

Cast 
Emir Kusturica as Secondo
Kseniya Rappoport as Lana
 Domenico Diele as  Pietro
Adriano Giannini as  Lorenzo
 Giovanni Vettorazzo as Stanislao
 Maria Roveran as  Sandra
 Rinat Khismatouline as  Lazlo
 Danilo Panzeri as  Attilio
 Marco Tenti as  Manlio
 Adriano Mosca as  Davide 
 Stefano Pellizzari as  Drago

See also 
 List of Italian films of 2014

References

External links 

 
2014 thriller films
Italian thriller films
2010s Italian-language films
2010s Italian films